High Society is a 1955 comedy film directed by William Beaudine and starring the comedy team of The Bowery Boys. The film was released on April 17, 1955, by Allied Artists and is the 37th film in the series.  It is the only film in the series to receive an Academy Award nomination, albeit through being mistaken for another film with the same title.

Plot
Sach receives news that he is the heir to the Terwilliger Debussy Jones fortune.  Accompanied by his pals Slip and Louie, he arrives at the Jones mansion to review the legal papers needed for him to claim his new fortune. However, Sach and Slip discover that the rightful heir, the young Terwilliger III, is being cheated out his inheritance by the miscreant duo of Stuyvesant Jones and Clarissa.  Sach and Slip, with the help of their fellow Bowery Boys, save the day and restore the heir’s inheritance.

Cast

The Bowery Boys
Leo Gorcey as Terence Aloysius "Slip" Mahoney
Huntz Hall as Horace Debussy "Sach" Jones
David Gorcey as Charles "Chuck" Anderson (credited as David Condon)
Bennie Bartlett as Butch Williams

Additional cast
Bernard Gorcey as Louie Dumbrowski
Amanda Blake as Clarissa Jones
Dayton Lummis as Stuyvesant Jones
Ronald Keith as Terwilliger Debussy "Twig" Jones III
Gavin Gordon as Frisbie
Dave Barry as Palumbo, the pianist
Paul Harvey as Henry Baldwin

Cast notes
Chuck (David Gorcey) and Butch (Bennie Bartlett) only appear at the beginning and end of this film.

Academy Award gaffe
For the 29th Academy Awards, High Society was accidentally included on the ballot in category for the Academy Award for Best Story. The error took place because another film with the same title – the Metro-Goldwyn-Mayer production of the 1956 Cole Porter musical High Society starring Bing Crosby, Grace Kelly and Frank Sinatra – was in release. Edward Bernds and Elwood Ullman, the screenwriters for The Bowery Boys comedy, acknowledged their nomination was a mistake and successfully requested their removal from the Academy Award ballot.

Home media
Warner Archives released the film on made-to-order DVD in the United States as part of The Bowery Boys, Volume Two on April 9, 2013.

See also
List of American films of 1955

References

External links
 

1955 films
American black-and-white films
Bowery Boys films
1955 comedy films
1950s English-language films
Films directed by William Beaudine
Allied Artists films
American comedy films